Woodford is a village in the south-east of County Galway, Ireland. It is situated between the River Shannon and the Slieve Aughty mountains.

History
The village's industrial history is indicated by a variant of its Irish name, Gráig na Muilte Iarainn, meaning 'village of the iron mills'. It is probable that the village started as a place to house and provide services for the iron workers on the 17th century. The surrounding hills have iron ore deposits; the abundant oak woods were used as a fuel for smelting. These had a lasting effect on the landscape; as the furnaces needed up to one hectare of mature woodland per day. The iron foundry had ceased operation by the late 18th or early 19th century.

The village also had a watermill in the valley, and in order for this to operate the river was dammed. This is what now appears as a small lake below the village.

Woodford Bay
The Woodford River is a tributary of the Shannon River. The river is dammed and broadens out into a small artificial lake called Woodford Bay. This reservoir was in the 17th century to power the blast furnace. Later, it was used as a source power for the corn mill and electric light energy for the town. While the bay is no longer used for these reasons, repairs have been undertaken to restore its aesthetic rather than commercial value.

Tourism
Woodford's amenities include a playground, tourist accommodation, a restaurant, several pubs and grocery and hardware shops. There are three nature reserves within 5 km of the village at Pollnaknockaun, Derrycrag and Rosturra. Two of these are in Special Areas of Conservation. Derrygill Millennium Oaks Forest is also within walking distance of the village and is one of only fourteen Millennium Oak Forests established in the Republic of Ireland in the year 2000 when the government gifted an oak tree to every family in Ireland at the turn of the millennium. Cycle routes in the surrounding hinterland have views of Lough Derg and the River Shannon. There is also fishing and boating on the Shannon. In the vicinity of the town are the ruins of a ring-fort over a thousand years old.

Every year, in late August, a "Furnace Festival" is held in Woodford to celebrate its ironworking history.

See also
List of towns and villages in Ireland
Galway
History of Galway

References

External links
Irelandmidwest.com - Galway towns - Woodford
Woodford, Co Galway, Ireland

Towns and villages in County Galway